Harry Bacharach (October 24, 1873 – May 13, 1947) was the Mayor of Atlantic City, New Jersey in 1912 for 6 months, and from 1916 to 1920, and again from 1930 to 1935. A Republican, he also served as a city commissioner.

Biography
Bacharach was born in 1873 in Philadelphia, to Betty (Nusbaum) and Jacob Bacharach. His brother was United States Congressman Isaac Bacharach.

In 1914, Bacharach was tried for election fraud in the 1910 mayoral election.

He died on May 13, 1947 in Atlantic City.

heritage 
The Bacharach Giants, a Negro league baseball team that played in Atlantic City, were created by his political allies and used his name as a promotional vehicle for the 1916 mayoral election.

Harry and his brother, Congressman Isaac Bacharach, founded the Betty Bacharach Home for Afflicted Children in honor of their mother, which opened in 1924. The home cared for children afflicted with infantile paralysis.  The building at 2305 Atlantic Avenue, Longport, New Jersey, became the borough hall in 1990.

Mr. Bacharach was also nicknamed “ Shore Gate “ after he shut down the major roads for the summer

In popular culture
Bacharach was played by actor John Rue in the HBO Television series Boardwalk Empire.

References

1873 births
1947 deaths
Politicians from Philadelphia
Mayors of Atlantic City, New Jersey
Jewish mayors of places in the United States
New Jersey Republicans
Jewish American people in New Jersey politics